Omplos is a mountain in Achaea, Greece. It rises steeply from the coastal plains around Patras to 926 m elevation. It is separated from the higher mountain Panachaikos by the valley of the river Glafkos. The summit is 2 km west of the village Petroto, 4 km east of  Kallithea, 4 km southeast of Saravali and 10 km southeast of Patras city centre.

The Omplos Monastery is situated on the mountain, at about 740 m elevation. Paragliding is commonly practiced on the mountain since the 1990s, and championships have been held.

References

External links
weather station of Omplos
Omplos Monastery  
Paragliding in Omplos

Landforms of Achaea
Geography of Patras
Mountains of Western Greece
Messatida